John Mulagada (12 December 1937 – 16 August 2009) was the Indian Roman Catholic bishop of the Roman Catholic Diocese of Eluru, India. Ordained to the priesthood on 4 January 1965, Pope Paul VI appointed Mulagada the first bishop of the newly created Eluru Diocese and he was ordained Bishop on 5 May 1977. Bishop Mulagada was the first Dalit to become bishop in India.

Notes

1937 births
2009 deaths
20th-century Roman Catholic bishops in India